Karl Johan Alfred Gustafsson  (1862–1936) was a Swedish politician. He was a member of the Högerpartiet (today's Moderate Party).

Overview 
Gustafsson was a member of the Riksdag's first chamber  1909–1933, always elected by Jönköping County constituency.

Gustafsson received the North Star Order. He was the father of Fritiof Domö, Elin Hakeman, Lennart Gustafsson and Gunnar Hakeman, all politicians for Högerpartiet.

References

This article was initially translated from the Swedish Wikipedia article.

Members of the Riksdag from the Centre Party (Sweden)
1862 births
1936 deaths